Shamira Raphaëla  (born 1982), is an Aruban–Dutch filmmaker. She is best known as the director of documentaries Daddy and the Warlord, Deal With It and Our Motherland.

Personal life
She was born in 1982 in the Caribbean and grew up in Aruba to a Dutch mother and a Curaçao father.

Career
After voorbereidend wetenschappelijk onderwijs (VWO), she moved to the Netherlands and studied fine arts at the Gerrit Rietveld Academie. Later she obtained a degree in media art from the ArtEZ University of Arts. Initially, she started to work as an independent director where she directed several television programs: Expeditie Robinson and Spuiten en Slikken. 

In 2006, Raphaela produced and directed her maiden short film With Salt In My Eyes. The short deals about three young Aruban women. After the success of several shorts, she made her first feature documentary Deal With It. The film received critical acclaim and later awarded at the Los Angeles Urban Film Festival, the Belize International Film Festival and the Aruba International Film Festival. The film revolves around the story of two drug dealers and addicts: father Pempy and brother Andy, actually her family members. The film was nominated for best Debut at the Netherlands Film Festival (NFF) 2015. In 2017, the film was awarded with the Lenno and the Sunfish the International Documentary Film Festival Amsterdam (IDFA) prize for the Best Youth Documentary. 

In 2017, she wrote the film Downfall of a Superwoman where she won the Karen de Bok Talent Award during IDFA, 2018. In the same year, she made Lenno and the Angelfish. The film received critical acclaim and won the Award for Best European Children's Documentary during the Berlin International Film Festival in 2019 and then received the Award for Best Children's Documentary at IDFA, 2018. 

In 2018, she made the biographical documentary Daddy and the Warlord which revolves around the story of journalist Clarice Gargard's father, who had been the right-hand man of Charles Taylor, the ex-president of Liberia. The film had its premiere at the Movies that Matter film festival in 2019. Later, the film won a Golden Calf for Best Short Documentary at the Dutch Film Festival 2019. In December 2019, she made the documentary Ons Motherland.

Filmography

References

External links
 
 2Doc: Ons moederland

Living people
1982 births
Gerrit Rietveld Academie alumni
Aruban people of Curaçao descent
Dutch film directors
Dutch television directors